James Alan Gaughran (born July 5, 1932) is an American water polo player who competed in the 1956 Summer Olympics.

He was born in San Francisco and swam and played college water polo for Stanford University. He was a member of the American water polo team which finished fifth in the 1956 tournament. He played two matches.

Gaughran was the head coach of Stanford's water polo team from 1969 to 1973, and was Stanford's swimming coach from 1960 to 1979. He coached Stanford's first NCAA Men's Swimming and Diving Championship team in 1967.

He is a member of the International Swimming Hall of Fame, the Stanford Athletic Hall of Fame and the USA Water Polo Hall of Fame.

See also
 List of members of the International Swimming Hall of Fame

References

External links
 

1932 births
Living people
Sportspeople from San Francisco
American male water polo players
Stanford Cardinal men's water polo players
Stanford Cardinal men's swimmers
Olympic water polo players of the United States
Water polo players at the 1956 Summer Olympics
American water polo coaches